The Canadian federal budget for fiscal year 1977-1978 was presented by Minister of Finance Donald Stovel Macdonald in the House of Commons of Canada on 31 March 1977. The budget introduced wage and price controls in an attempt to control inflation. This policy had been a campaign proposal put forward by Robert Stanfield's Progressive Conservatives it the 1974 Canadian federal election, but was criticized by Pierre Trudeau at the time.

External links 

 Budget Plan
 Budget in Brief

References

Canadian budgets
1977 in Canadian law
1977 government budgets
1977 in Canadian politics